A release dove is usually a small white domestic rock dove used for events such as public ceremonies, weddings and funerals. They typically have a symbolic meaning for the event.

Subspecies and types 

Typically one or more white doves are released. Sometimes doves are called pigeons, there is no distinction.  Usually domestic rock doves (Columba livia domestica) bred for small size and white coloration are released due to their homing ability.

Barbary doves (Streptopelia risoria), also known as ringneck doves, carry a mutation that makes them completely white. These white Barbary doves are most commonly used in stage magic acts.  White Barbary doves are sometimes released in large public ceremonies as a peace symbol, and at weddings and funerals. However, releases usually use homing pigeons, as Barbary doves lack the homing instinct and will die if released into the wild.

Albinism or other genetic anomalies that produce an entirely white dove occur very rarely in the wild since an all-white coloration would make these birds stand out in their natural habitats, leaving them highly vulnerable to predators.

Ethics 
Although dove release businesses advertise that their birds will be able to safely return home, released doves are frequently killed in accidents or by predators before they can return home. Trained white homing pigeons, domesticated forms of the rock dove, stand a better chance of returning home if vigorously trained prior to release by a trainer and within a distance of 600 miles from the loft. Ringneck doves that are released into the wild and survive will likely starve to death. There are currently no businesses in North America offering release of ringneck doves.  All businesses without exception release white homing pigeons although uninformed amateurs may release white ringneck doves this is highly unlikely because they often sale for more than 3 times the price of homing pigeons.  

Humans have been releasing pigeons for millennia selecting birds primarily based on their homing abilities.  From the ancient Greeks to the 5th-century Egyptians, people have for centuries released birds in remembrance, mourning and celebration.  As in the wild, birds are occasionally lost to depredation although this is uncommon in most environments.  Birds imprint on their home loft and are able to navigate home over hundreds of miles of unfamiliar territory.   Birds are trained at a young age over incrementally longer distances to ensure the birds return home safely.  Although birds are occasionally lost this is the exception not the norm.   

Most of the pigeons bred for dove release services are bred for their color and small size, not for their homing abilities or flight speed, as a result, some birds are attacked by predators moments after they are released. Some released birds become confused and are found injured or dead nearby their original release site. Since these are domesticated birds, they do not possess the instincts or skills to survive in the wild.

Increased public awareness about animal cruelty, and the influx of injured or lost release doves in animal shelters is decreasing the demand for release dove services.

Symbolic use

Theological 
In The Epic of Gilgamesh, an epic poem from ancient Mesopotamia, a flood narrative is present, where the character Utnapishtim sends out a dove in the hope it will find land. However, the dove returns to his ship and he assumes it did not find land.

The release of doves is associated with the Genesis flood narrative; where a dove is sent out three times as the flood waters are receding.

The use of a dove and olive branch as a symbol of peace originated with the early Christians, who portrayed the act of baptism accompanied by a dove holding an olive branch in its beak and also used the image on their sepulchres.

Olympic games 
The ritual of releasing doves in the Olympic games originated in 1896. The doves in the 1896 Olympics were released as part of the closing ceremony; the ritual became an official part of the opening ceremony in the 1920 Antwerp games. The ritual was altered to be purely symbolic after the doves released in the 1988 Seoul Olympics landed on the Olympic Torch and were burnt alive when it was lit. At the Olympics 2021, in Tokyo, a thousand paper doves were used instead of real birds.

The Vatican 
In 2004, Pope John Paul II released doves, with children, to promote Christian unity and world peace.

In 2005, Pope John Paul II started a yearly January tradition of children releasing doves from a window to promote world peace. The practice was problematic due to the birds not flying away and returning to the window 2005, 2012. At some releases the doves were attacked by other birds, a seagull in 2013, and a seagull and a crow in 2014.

In December 2013, at an event where Pope Benedict XVI released doves during a Holocaust remembrance event the birds were attacked by a seagull.

Since 2015, The Vatican no longer engages in the releasing doves due to the problems of birds not flying away and being attacked by other birds.  The notoriety of this event generated a public outcry for the Vatican to halt this practice. A balloon release has been used instead in 2015 and 2018.

See also
 Balloon release
 Sky lantern

References

External links 

 Professional White Dove Release Association - US, Canada, Great Britain
 National Pigeon Association (USA)
 American Racing Pigeon Union
 International Federation of American Homing Pigeon Fanciers
 National Pigeon Association (Great Britain)
 Canadian Racing Pigeon Union
 The Canadian Pigeon Fanciers Association
 National White Dove Release Society

Aviculture
Ceremonies
Domestic pigeons
Introduced birds